Ben Cura is an Argentine-born British actor, musician and director of film, television and theatre.

Early life
José Ben Cura was born in Buenos Aires, the son of Argentine tenor/conductor José Cura. When he was a year old, he moved to Santo Stefano Belbo, Italy, where his father's grandfather was from. The family first lived in a convent while his father struggled to find work as an opera singer. He has two younger siblings, Yazmín and Nicolás.

The family moved to France when he was six and then to Spain when he was 11. During this time, he frequently travelled with his parents around the world.

Cura's first acting role came at age nine, as a supernumerary in a production of La Forza del Destino at the Opéra de Marseille, France. Whilst living in Paris, he received formal piano and solfège training. He subsequently attended the New York Film Academy in Paris before eventually training and graduating from the London Academy of Music and Dramatic Art in 2011 with a bachelor's degree with honours in professional acting.

Career
Cura made his film debut in a British independent film Comes a Bright Day, appearing shortly after in Comedy Central's series Threesome and Bernard Rose's film The Devil's Violinist.

He made his West End debut playing Angel in the original cast of Jennifer Saunders' musical Viva Forever at the Piccadilly Theatre in London, UK. He was later cast as Seve Ballesteros in British golf film Dream On.

Aged 24, he made his directorial debut with a film adaptation of August Strindberg's play Creditors. for which he also wrote the screenplay and played one of the lead characters, Freddie Lynch. Later that year, he starred in the UK premiere of the award-winning American play Next Fall at the Southwark Playhouse in London, UK.

In April 2013, he co-founded London-based production company Tough Dance Ltd. with actress and producer Andrea Deck. The company's first production was award-winning feature film Creditors.
In 2015, he was cast in the US series The Royals as recurring character Holden. He later went on to star in British film White Island set in Ibiza, and based on the novel A Bus Could Run You Over written by Colin Butts, alongside Billy Zane and Billy Boyd.

Cura's directorial debut, Creditors, world-premiered at the Nordic International Film Festival in New York City on 31 October 2015. The festival awarded it with an Honorable Mention in the Best Nordic Narrative Feature category. Latin Post film critic David Salazar called the film "A triumphant debut." Blazing Minds film critic Susanne Hodder said the actors "all give compelling performances, bringing their characters to life and giving them depth". Screen Relish film critic Stuie Greenfield said that "Creditors is a beautiful, sometimes angry and surprising film that brings with it strong performances from the entire cast as well as an unexpected yet welcome twist", while Movie Marker film critic Darryl Griffiths said that "Creditors is an incisive and accomplished piece of filmmaking [...], possessing a rich, powerful psychology that instills an unnerving modern-day relevance to age-old material." Creditors received over ten awards from various film festivals, including Best Feature, Leading Actor, and Script/Writer for Cura.

Later that year, Cura was cast as a series regular in ITV/Netflix crime noir drama Marcella penned by The Bridge writer Hans Rosenfeldt. The series premiered on UK television in April 2016, followed by a worldwide release on Netflix in July 2016. and Simon West's action/comedy feature film Gun Shy opposite Antonio Banderas and Olga Kurylenko.

In 2017, Cura was cast as CIA operative Philip Shafer in French historical war movie 15 minutes de guerre (renamed L'Intervention), directed by Fred Grivois. Later that year, he played the role of Steve in the screen adaptation of British stage play Life is a Gatecrash, renamed Gatecrash and directed by Lawrence Gough, opposite Olivia Bonamy, Anton Lesser, and Sam West.

In 2018, Cura guest-starred in Season 2 of CBS's Ransom and the first season of new TV series The Rook, opposite Olivia Munn.

In 2019, he was cast in Nicholas Wright's new stage play 8 Hotels directed by Richard Eyre, world-premiering at the Chichester Festival Theatre, playing the lead role of José Ferrer opposite Tory Kittles, Emma Paetz, and Pandora Colin, opening August 7 of that year to excellent reviews: "Joe, played masterfully by Ben Cura, is wonderful as the philanderer who can accept his wife's adultery but not her lover's flaunting of it"; "Jose Ferrer [...] Ben Cura, who captures him very well, has a wonderful mutually mistrustful good-pals-act with the impressive Kittles"; "Ben Cura is excellent as Ferrer [...] with charisma to spare"; "Ben Cura plays José Ferrer as a much disappointed jobbing actor [...] playing Iago for peanuts opposite the better paid Robeson [...] This Ferrer becomes increasingly jealous of Robeson and is convinced that his wife, Uta Hagen [...] is having an affair with the charismatic Robeson (she is), which fills him with an angry cynicism that he can barely control with his erudite and scathing humour that cannot disguise his underlying lack of confidence. Cura's Ferrer is a brilliant creation: a brilliant Iago in fact."

In 2021, Cura founded production company and music label W.I.P. Media. Later that year, Cura released his debut music single "Water" on streaming platforms, accompanied by an official music video on VEVO followed by second single "Toutes Les Couleurs" and its accompanying VEVO music video and a third single "Argento" alongside a third VEVO music video. On July 30, he released his debut instrumental E.P. Extended Play No.1.

Personal life 
Cura was married to actress Andrea Deck from 2013 until their divorce in 2015. He dated actress Olga Kurylenko, but they broke up just before the COVID-19 pandemic.

Filmography

Film

Television

Video games

Stage
2012: Viva Forever by Jennifer Saunders at the Piccadilly Theatre London
2014: Next Fall by Geoffrey Nauffts at the Southwark Playhouse London
2019: 8 Hotels by Nicholas Wright at the Chichester Festival Theatre Chichester

Voice work
2012: Swimming with Piranhas Radio Documentary for BBC Radio 4
2015: Credit Card Baby Radio Drama written by Annie Caulfield for BBC Radio 4, directed by Mary Ward-Lowery
2019: Alien III audiobook by  Audible
2020: Trafalgar Audiobook for  Penguin and  Audible
2020: Camino De Santiago Sleep story for Calm and Calm France
2022: The Limits to Growth Radio drama written by Sarah Woods for BBC Radio 4, directed by Emma Harding
2023: Chronicle Of A Death Foretold Audiobook for  Penguin and  Audible

Discography

Awards and nominations

References

External links 

Living people
Alumni of the London Academy of Music and Dramatic Art
Argentine people of Italian descent
British actors of Latin American descent
British film directors
British film producers
British male film actors
British male musicians
British male screenwriters
British male stage actors
British people of Argentine descent
British people of Italian descent
Male actors from London
Year of birth missing (living people)